Walter TV is a Canadian indie rock band, consisting of Pierce McGarry (vocals, guitar), Joe McMurray (drums) and Simon Ankenman (bass). To date, the band has released three studio albums, Appetite (2013), Blessed (2015) and Carpe Diem (2017). 

Joe McMurray performs in Mac DeMarco's live band, with DeMarco guitarist Andy White also playing in Walter TV in 2012.

Band members
Current
Pierce McGarry - vocals, guitar
Joe McMurray - drums
Simon Ankenman - bass guitar

Former
Mac DeMarco - bass guitar
Peter Sagar - bass guitar
 Trevor Baird - bass guitar
 Andy White - bass guitar
 Matt Sharpe - drums
 Edwin White - steel drum

Discography
 Appetite (2012) 
 Blessed (2015)
 Carpe Diem (2017)

References

Canadian indie rock groups
Musical groups from Vancouver